Eric Forman may refer to:

 Eric Forman (That '70s Show), fictional character played by Topher Grace
 Eric Forman (artist) (born 1973), New York-based artist and designer